Gurumayum Bonny Sharma is an Indian actor and singer who predominantly appears in Manipuri films. He is famous for movies 'Yaiskul Pakhang Angaoba', 'Beragee Bomb', 'Mr Khadang'.  He is a resident of Keishamthong Maning Longjam Leikai, Imphal, Manipur. He has also worked in the Shumang Kumheis including Kunti series, Nongallamdaisida, Opium War, and Pizza.

Career
Bonny had tried many jobs before coming into the world of performing arts. In 1994-95, he joined Bashikhong Dramatic Union. Later, he was a theatre artist for around ten years in Panthoibi Natya Mandir. Before coming into films, he had already acted in Shumang Kumheis. Aruba Eechel, Amamba Lambee, Kunti 6 (Mihatpung), Nongallamdaishida, Yeningthana Ngairi, Opium War and Pizza are his famous Shumang Leelas. Both his parents were also theatre artist in the Manipur Dramatic Union (MDU).

His first film is Lanmei Thanbi where he played a villain role, alongside Kaiku Rajkumar and Abenao Elangbam. He is best known for his role as Yo Sanatombi in the film Yaiskulgee Pakhang Angaoba. Other famous films of Bonny are Nungshibase Phagi Natte, VDF Thasana, Beragee Bomb, Chow Chow Momo na haobara Shingju Bora na oinambara, Yaiphare Yaiphare, Amamba Sayon, Western Sankirtan, Delhi Mellei and Mr. Khadang. 

In the movie Ningtha, he played a differently abled guy. He played double roles in the film Chow Chow Momo na haobara Shingju Bora na oinambara. In Producer Director, he was given the role of a film maker named Tomthin Cameroon. He portrayed the role of a mentally different guy in Tamoyaigee Ebecha.

VDF Thasana is a movie of his own home production. He is well known for his unique acting skills and humour in Manipuri films.

Accolades
Gurumayum Bonny won the Best Actor Award at 8th Manipur State Film Festival, 2013 for the film Yaiskulgee Pakhang Angaoba. He played the role of Yo Sanatombi in the film. Bonny was awarded the Best Actor in a Leading Role - Male for his role in the film Western Sankirtan at the 2nd SSS MANIFA 2013.

In the 9th Manipur State Film Awards 2014, he bagged the Best Male Playback Singer award for the song Ha Ha Tomal. In the same year, for the film Beragee Bomb, he bagged the Best Actor in a Negative Role award at the 3rd SSS MANIFA 2014. He also won the award for Best Actor in a Negative Role for the film Khongfam at the 6th SSS MANIFA 2017. As of 2019, he won the Best Actor in a Lead Role - Male for his role in the film Eina Fagi Touraga at the 8th SSS MANIFA 2019.

In the 14th Manipur State Film Awards 2022, he won the Best Supporting Actor (Male) for the film Nongallamdaishida.

Selected filmography

References

External links
 

Meitei Brahmins
Brahmins of Manipur
Living people
21st-century Indian male actors
Indian male film actors
Male actors from Manipur
Meitei people
People from Imphal
Shumang Kumhei artists
Year of birth missing (living people)